The National Health Service (Private Finance) Act 1997 (c 56) enabled NHS trusts to borrow money or rent out property in loan agreements with the private sector, to expand their facilities or build new buildings. As it enabled a major kind of private finance initiative, it has been highly controversial.

Contents
Section 1 provides:

See also
UK enterprise law

References

United Kingdom enterprise law
United Kingdom Acts of Parliament 1997